Orthocomotis longuncus is a species of moth of the family Tortricidae. It is found in Ecuador in Morona-Santiago and Tungurahua provinces.

References

Moths described in 2003
Orthocomotis